Meg Ward (born 18 August 1994) is an Australian rugby league footballer who plays as a  and  for the Brisbane Broncos in the NRL Women's Premiership and the Valleys Diehards in the QRL Women's Premiership.

She is an Australian and Queensland representative and has won three premierships with the Broncos.

Background
Born in Gosford, Ward moved to Brisbane when she was two years old.

Growing up, she played soccer and later rugby union. After joining the Australian Defence Force and moving to Darwin, she began playing rugby league for the Northern Sharks and Northern Territory Titans.

Playing career
In 2017, Ward represented Australia at the 2017 Women's Rugby League World Cup, scoring three tries in the tournament.

2018
In June, Ward represented the ADF at the Women's National Championships. On 14 June, she joined the Brisbane Broncos NRL Women's Premiership team.

In Round 1 of the 2018 NRL Women's season, she made her debut for the Broncos in a 30–4 win over the St George Illawarra Dragons.

2019
In May, she represented the ADF at the Women's National Championships. On 21 June, she started on the wing for Queensland in their 4–14 loss to New South Wales.

On 6 October, she started on the wing and kicked five goals in the Broncos 30–6 Grand Final win over the Dragons. She finished the 2019 season as the Broncos leading point scorer with 14.

2020
On 25 October, Ward won her third NRLW premiership with the Broncos, kicking two goals in their 20–10 Grand Final win over the Roosters. She finished the season as the competition's top point scorer with 30.

2021
In 2021, Ward joined the Valleys Diehards in the QRL Women's Premiership.

References

External links
Brisbane Broncos profile

1994 births
Living people
Australian female rugby league players
Australia women's national rugby league team players
Rugby league centres
Rugby league wingers
Brisbane Broncos (NRLW) players